James Franklin "Frank" Caldwell Jr. (born March 24, 1959) is an admiral in the United States Navy who currently serves as director of the Naval Nuclear Propulsion Program, a job once held by the program's creator, Admiral Hyman G. Rickover. He previously served as Naval Inspector General.

Caldwell is currently the Navy's Old Goat, the longest serving United States Naval Academy graduate on active duty, having received the award and accompanying title from Admiral William K. Lescher on August 31, 2022.

Naval career
Caldwell received his commission graduating with distinction from the United States Naval Academy in 1981 with a Bachelor of Science in Marine Engineering; he is a fifth-generation Academy graduate. He holds a Master of Science in operations research from the Naval Postgraduate School.

Caldwell’s early sea tours include serving in both the Atlantic and Pacific Fleets.

Caldwell commanded  home ported in Norfolk, Virginia; Submarine Development Squadron 12 in New London, Connecticut; and Submarine Group 9 in Bangor, Washington. In his most recent afloat command, he commanded SUBPAC (Submarine Forces Pacific) as COMSUBPAC.

Ashore, Caldwell served on the Pacific Fleet Nuclear Propulsion Examining Board, and later as Undersea Warfare Requirements officer on the staff of Commander in Chief, U.S. Pacific Fleet. He also served as senior member of the Naval Submarine Force’s Tactical Readiness Evaluation Team, on the Joint Staff as deputy director for Politico-Military Affairs for Europe, the North Atlantic Treaty Organization, Russia and Africa, and deputy commander for U.S. Strategic Command's Joint Functional Component Command for Global Strike in Omaha, Nebraska.

On August 5, 2015, Caldwell was confirmed by the US Senate to become admiral. Caldwell assumed his duties as the seventh director of Naval Reactors on August 14, 2015, normally an eight-year term.

Awards and decorations

References

External links

 Navy Biography 
 U.S Naval Inspector General official webpage

United States Navy admirals
Living people
1959 births
United States Naval Academy alumni
United States Navy Inspectors General
Recipients of the Legion of Merit